Automóvil is a Spanish language monthly automobile magazine published in Madrid, Spain. It is the oldest car magazine in the country.

History and profile
Automóvil was started in 1978. The magazine is owned and published by Motorpress Iberica S.A. on a monthly basis. Its editor-in-chief is Juan Carlos Payo. The magazine has its headquarters in Madrid and covers news on local and international automobile sector and new arrivals.

In 2009 Automóvil had a circulation of 90,071 copies, making it the best-selling automobile magazine in Spain.

See also
 List of magazines in Spain

References

External links
 Official website

1978 establishments in Spain
Automobile magazines
Magazines established in 1978
Magazines published in Madrid
Monthly magazines published in Spain
Spanish-language magazines